Trichomyrmex rogeri is a species of ant in the subfamily Myrmicinae. It is found in Sri Lanka. Gustav Mayr described the species in 1865.

References

External links

 at antwiki.org
Animaldiversity.org

Myrmicinae
Hymenoptera of Asia
Insects described in 1865